A constitutional referendum was held in Tuvalu on 30 April 2008. The referendum sought to abolish the monarchy of Tuvalu and establish the country as a republic. Had the referendum passed, the new president would have been indirectly elected by the Parliament of Tuvalu.

The referendum failed, with 679 votes in favour of establishing a republic and 1,260 votes to retain the monarchy. As a consequence, Tuvalu remained a monarchy, and Elizabeth II remained head of state. Turnout for the referendum was low. Only 1,939 voters cast valid ballots, out of the approximately 9,000 voting-aged Tuvaluans. In comparison, 8,501 votes were cast in the 2006 parliamentary election. A previous referendum on becoming a republic in 1986 was also rejected.

Results

See also
1999 Australian republic referendum
2009 Vincentian constitutional referendum

References

2008 referendums
Constitutional referendum
Referendums in Tuvalu
Republicanism in Tuvalu
Law of Tuvalu
Constitutional referendums
Sovereignty referendums
Monarchy referendums
April 2008 events in Oceania